Donica Merriman is a retired American track and field athlete competing in hurdling. In 2001, she reached the semi-finals in the women's 100 metres hurdles at the 2001 World Championships in Athletics in Edmonton, Canada.

References

External links 
 

Living people
Year of birth missing (living people)
Place of birth missing (living people)
American female hurdlers
World Athletics Championships athletes for the United States
21st-century American women